Loknath Sharma is a Bhutanese politician who has been Minister for Economic Affairs since November 2018. He has been a member of the National Assembly of Bhutan, since October 2018.

Early life and education

He received a Bachelor of Science degree from Sherubtse College, Bhutan and a Master of Arts in Economics degree from University of Allahabad, India. He completed his Advance Diploma in Community Services from the Canberra Institute of Technology, Australia.

Professional career
Before joining politics, he was served as Community service worker, Economics consultant and Transport management specialist.

Political career
Sharma is a member the Druk Nyamrup Tshogpa (DNT). He participated in the 2013 Bhutanese National Assembly election. He was elected to the National Assembly of Bhutan in the 2018 elections for the Dophuchen-Tading constituency. He received 5,069 votes and defeated Thakur Singh Powdyel. On 3 November, Lotay Tshering formally announced his cabinet structure and Sharma was named as Minister for Economic Affairs. On 7 November 2018, he was sworn in as Minister for Economic Affairs in the cabinet of Prime Minister Lotay Tshering.

References 

Bhutanese politicians
1971 births
Living people
Bhutanese people of Nepalese descent
Sherubtse College alumni
University of Allahabad alumni
Bhutanese MNAs 2018–2023
Lotay Tshering ministry
Druk Nyamrup Tshogpa politicians
Druk Nyamrup Tshogpa MNAs